Uteriporidae is a family of Maricola triclads.

References

External links 

Maricola